Fredric William Abbott (16 October 1928 – 10 July 1996) was an Australian stage, film and television actor.

Of Irish descent, Abbott was born a fifth-generation Australian in Newtown, Sydney and was educated at Newtown Boys High School. His career began in the late 1950s at Doris Fitton's Independent Theatre in North Sydney.
 
His TV appearances include Z-Cars (1962), The Avengers (1963), The Saint (1963-8), Danger Man (1965-6), The Baron (1966),
The Prisoner (1967) episode Do Not Forsake Me Oh My Darling, Man in a Suitcase (1968), Department S (1969), The Champions (1969), The Troubleshooters (1971), Special Branch (1974), and The Flying Doctors (1985). His film appearances include Fun and Games (1971), Tower of Evil (1972), Mistress Pamela (1974) and Revenge of the Pink Panther (1978).

He died in 1996 after an 18-month-long battle with cancer.

Filmography

References

External links
 

1928 births
1996 deaths
Australian male film actors
Australian male soap opera actors
Australian male stage actors
British male film actors
British male soap opera actors
British male stage actors
Male actors from Sydney
20th-century British male actors
20th-century Australian male actors
Australian people of Irish descent
Deaths from cancer in New South Wales